Catherine Mabillard (born 9 June 1964) from Troistorrents VS is a Swiss ski mountaineer and marathon mountain biker.

Mabillard was born in Bex. She started ski mountaineering in 1985 and competed first in the Trophée de Valerette race in 1986.

Selected results

Ski mountaineering 
 1992:
 1st, Patrouille de la Maya A-course, together with Mélanie Farquet and Ruth Lutti
 1994:
 1st, Patrouille de la Maya A-course, together with Sandra Zimmerli and Marika Ducret
 1996:
 1st, Patrouille de la Maya A-course, together with Elsie Briguet and Marianne Chapuisat
 1998:
 1st and course record, Tour de Matterhorn (together with Sandra Zimmerli and Cristina Favre-Moretti)
 2001:
 1st, European Championship team race (together with Sandra Zimmerli)
 1st, Swiss Cup
 1st, Tour du Rutor (together with Véronique Ançay)
 2002:
 1st, Patrouille de la Maya A-course, together with Véronique Ançay and Anne Bochatay
 3rd, World Championship single race
 3rd, Trophée des Gastlosen (together with Anne Bochatay)
 5th, World Championship team race (together with Christine Luyet)
 5th, World Championship combination ranking
 2003:
 1st, European Championship team race (together Cristina Favre-Moretti)
 1st, Dolomiti Cup team (together with Cristina Favre-Moretti)
 1st, Trophée des Gastlosen (together with Anne Bochatay)
 2nd, European Championship single race
 2nd, European Championship combination ranking
 2004:
 1st, World Championship team race (together with Cristina Favre-Moretti)
 1st, World Championship relay race (together with Cristina Favre-Moretti and Isabella Crettenand-Moretti)
 2nd, World Championship combination ranking
 2nd, Trophée des Gastlosen, together with Anne Bochatay
 4th, World Championship single race
 2005:
 2nd, European Championship team race (together with Gabrielle Magnenat)
 5th, European Championship vertical race
 2006:
 1st, Trophée des Gastlosen, together with Séverine Pont-Combe
 2nd, Swiss Championship vertical race
 3rd, World Championship vertical race
 3rd, World Championship team race (together with Séverine Pont-Combe)
 2007:
 3rd, European Championship team race (together with Nathalie Etzensperger)
 3rd, European Championship relay race (together with Catherine Mabillard and Nathalie Etzensperger)
 6th, European Championship vertical race
 6th, European Championship combination ranking
 9th, European Championship single race
 2008:
 3rd, World Championship team race (together with Gabrielle Magnenat)
 3rd, Mountain Attack race
 4th, World Championship long distance
 2009:
 1st, Zermatt-Rothorn run
 1st, Trophée nocturne de la Berneuse, Leysin
 2nd, Sky ski trophée (together with Anne Bochatay)
 2nd, Mountain Attack race
 2010:
 2nd, Zermatt-Rothorn run
 3rd, Sellaronda Skimarathon, together with Andréa Zimmermann
 2012:
 2nd, Trophée des Gastlosen, together with Andréa Zimmermann

Pierra Menta 

 1999: 4th, together with Véronique Ançay
 2003: 2nd, together with Anne Bochatay
 2004: 1st, together with Cristina Favre-Moretti
 2005: 3rd, together with Séverine Pont-Combe

Patrouille des Glaciers 

 1998: 1st and course record, together with Sandra Zimmerli and Cristina Favre-Moretti
 2000: 1st, together with Sandra Zimmerli and Cristina Favre-Moretti
 2004: 1st, and course record, together with Cristina Favre-Moretti and Isabella Crettenand-Moretti
 2006: 1st, and course record, together with Gabrielle Magnenat and Séverine Pont-Combe
 2008: 3rd, together with Cristina Favre-Moretti and Isabella Crettenand-Moretti
 2010: 3rd, (and 1st in the "civilian women" ranking), together with Andréa Zimmermann and Sophie Dusautoir Bertrand

Mountain biking

Grand Raid Cristalp 
 1999: 3rd, 131 km
 2001: 1st, 131 km
 2002: 3rd, 131 km

References

External links 
 Catherine Mabillard at SkiMountaineering.org

1964 births
Living people
Swiss female ski mountaineers
World ski mountaineering champions
Marathon mountain bikers
People from Aigle District
Sportspeople from the canton of Vaud